Adriano in Siria ("Hadrian in Syria") is an 18th-century Italian opera seria in 3 acts by the Czech composer Josef Mysliveček. It was composed to a libretto of the same name by the Italian poet Metastasio that was first performed in 1732 with music of Antonio Caldara and in more than 60 further settings until 1828. For a performance in the 1770s, it would only be expected that a libretto of such age would be abbreviated and altered to suit contemporary operatic taste. No other of the composer's settings of Metatasio's texts contains as many substitute aria texts as this one does. The cuts and changes in the text made for the 1776 performance of Mysliveček's opera are not attributable.

Performance history
The electoral court of Munich intended to engage Mysliveček to compose an opera for the carnival season of 1776, but the composer found himself unable to travel due to the effects of syphilis. He remained in Florence for an extra year, but made remarkable use of his time. He was able to see productions of his new oratorio Isacco figura del redentore (perhaps his greatest composition) during Lent of 1776 and the opera Adriano in Siria in the autumn. He also came into contact with the Florentine music publisher Ranieri del Vivo, who published a number of his orchestral works, including a collection of his symphonies that constituted the first anthology of symphonies ever published in Italy. The opera was very successful, in particular the music written for the tenor singer Giovanni Ansani, and was revived in Perugia for the carnival operatic season of 1777, then in Pavia in the spring of the same year. The outstanding aria for Ansani was "Leon piagato al morte," which was widely disseminated in manuscript form in the 18th century. Mysliveček's friend and close professional associate, the noted castrato Tommaso Guarducci, repeated his role of Farnaspe in the Perugia production.

Roles

Vocal set pieces

Act 1, scene 1 – Aria of Adriano, "Dal labbro, che t'accende"
Act 1, scene 2 – Aria of Farnaspe, "Cari affanni, amate pene" [a non-Metastasian text]
Act 1, scene 3 – Aria of Osroa, "Chi della sorte infida" [a non-Metastasian text]
Act 1, scene 5 - Aria of Farnaspe, "Dopo un tuo sguardo, ingrata"
Act 1, scene 9 – Aria of Emirena, "Prigionera abbandonata"
Act 1, scene 11 – Aria of Sabina, "Numi se giusti siete"
Act 1, scene 13 – Aria of Osroa, "Parto? Resto? Figlia, amico" [a non-Metastasian text]
Act 1, scene 14 – Duet of Farnaspe and Emirena, "Se non ti moro allato" [a non-Metastasian text]
Act 2, scene 1 – Aria of Aquilio, "Quanto è facil trionfare" [a non-Metastasian text]
Act 2, scene 2 – Aria of Emirena, "A ritrovar mi chiama" [a non-Metastasian text]
Act 2, scene 4 – Aria of Adriano, "Fra l'amore, e la ragione" [a non-Metastasian text]
Act 2, scene 6 – Aria of Emirena, "Che fa il mio bene" [a non-Metastasian text]
Act 2, scene 6 – Aria of Sabina, "Volga il ciel, felici amanti" [a non-Metastasian text]
Act 2, scene 7 – Aria of Farnaspe, "Cara se le mie pene" [a non-Metastsian text]
Act 2, scene 9 – Aria of Osroa, "Leon piagato a morte"
Act 2, scene 11 – Quartet for Adriano, Emirena, Farnaspe, and Osroa, "Tutti nemici, e rei"
Act 3, scene 2 – Aria of Adriano, "Barbaro non comprendo"
Act 3, scene 3 – Aria of Osroa, "Non ritrova un'alma sorte"
Act 3, scene 4 – Aria of Farnaspe, "Io ti lascio, e questo addio" [a non-Metastasian text]
Act 3, scene 5 – Aria of Emirena, "Ah che mancar mi sento" [a non-Metastasian text]
Act 3, scene 7 – Chorus, "S'oda, Augusto, infin sull'etra"

Recording

The aria "Barbaro non comprendo" has been recorded by Max Emanuel Cenčić with the Orquestra Barocca de Sevilla, George Petrou, conductor, in the anthology Venezia, released by Virgin Classics in 2013.

References

Italian-language operas
Operas by Josef Mysliveček
1776 operas
Opera seria
Operas